Paige Pearce (born March 21, 1995) is an American compound archer. She won two medals at the 2019 World Archery Championships held in 's-Hertogenbosch, Netherlands: the silver medal in the women's individual compound event and also the silver medal in the women's team compound event.

In 2019, she won the bronze medal in the women's individual event at the Pan American Games held in Lima, Peru. In 2020, she won the women's compound event at the Vegas Shoot held in Las Vegas, United States. She also competed in the inaugural Lockdown Knockout tournament organised by World Archery where she was ultimately eliminated by Sara López of Colombia.

She won the bronze medal in the women's team compound event at the 2021 World Archery Championships held in Yankton, South Dakota, United States. She also competed in the women's individual compound and compound mixed team events.

In January 2022, she finished in second place in the Women’s Open Pro event at the Lancaster Archery Classic held near Lancaster, Pennsylvania, United States.

She represented the United States at the 2022 World Games held in Birmingham, Alabama, United States. She won the bronze medal in the women's compound event. She defeated Toja Ellison of Slovenia in her bronze medal match.

References

External links 
 

Living people
1995 births
Place of birth missing (living people)
American female archers
World Archery Championships medalists
Archers at the 2019 Pan American Games
Pan American Games medalists in archery
Pan American Games bronze medalists for the United States
Medalists at the 2019 Pan American Games
Competitors at the 2022 World Games
World Games bronze medalists
World Games medalists in archery
20th-century American women
21st-century American women